

Escabeche is the name for a number of dishes in Spanish, Portuguese, Filipino and Latin American cuisines, consisting of marinated fish, meat or vegetables, cooked or pickled in an acidic sauce (usually with vinegar), and colored with paprika, citrus, and other spices.

In both Spain and Latin America, many variations exist, including frying the main ingredient before marinating it. Escabeche of seafood, fish, chicken, rabbit, pork, and vegetables  are common in Spain, Caribbean and Portugal. Eggplant escabeche is common in Argentina.

Terminology
The Spanish and Portuguese word escabeche originates from Andalusi Arabic (spoken in Muslim Iberia) and ultimately Persian. It is derived from al-skepaj, the name of a popular meat dish cooked in a sweet-and-sour sauce, usually containing vinegar and honey or date molasses. This technique spread throughout the former Spanish Empire and is particularly common in Latin America and the Philippines.

The dish is known as escoveitch or escoveech fish in Jamaica and is marinated in a sauce of vinegar, onions, carrots, and Scotch bonnet peppers overnight. It is known as scapece or savoro in Italy, savoro in Greece (especially Ionian islands), and scabetche in North Africa.

Variations
The dish is common in Spain and has evolved with local modifications in the Spanish-speaking world. It is well represented in Portugal, usually spiced with peppercorns, chilies, peppers, onions, garlic and sliced carrots. The dish is popular in the Philippines and Guam, both former Spanish colonies, where it is the closest to the original Spanish version: using fish that is locally available but respecting the original technique.

In international versions like in Peru, escabeche is usually poached or fried, then served cold after marinating in a refrigerator overnight or longer. The acid in the marinade is usually vinegar but can include citrus juice (a common conservation technique—a pH of 4 or lower effectively stops rotting). Escabeche is a popular presentation of canned or potted preserved fish, such as mackerel, tuna, bonito, or sardines.

Escabeche oriental is a dish of the cuisine of Yucatan (Mexico) and Belize. It is called oriental (eastern), because it is a dish from the eastern part of Yucatán, specifically the city of Valladolid. It is prepared with turkey or chicken, which was marinated in a mixture of coriander leaves, salt, pepper, cumin, cloves, cinnamon, vinegar and garlic. The chicken is boiled in water with onion strips and sour orange juice. Then, the cooked meat is fried in butter or oil with garlic, oregano and salt.

See also
Arsik
Brathering, a German version, often served for breakfast
Ceviche, raw fish in an acidic marinade
Kelaguen
Nanbanzuke

References

Cuisine of Abruzzo
Mexican cuisine
Philippine cuisine
Portuguese cuisine
Spanish cuisine
Fish dishes
Latin American cuisine
Belizean cuisine
Bahamian cuisine
Guamanian cuisine
Italian cuisine
Jamaican cuisine